Olive Township, Ohio may refer to:

Olive Township, Meigs County, Ohio
Olive Township, Noble County, Ohio

Ohio township disambiguation pages